The duskystripe shiner (Luxilus pilsbryi) is a freshwater ray-finned fish in the family Cyprinidae, the carps and minnows. It occurs in tributaries of the White and Little Red rivers of Missouri and Arkansas. Its preferred habitat is rocky and sandy pools and runs of headwaters, creeks and small rivers.

References

Luxilus
Freshwater fish of the United States
Fish described in 1904